Erra-Pater (or Erra Pater) is the assumed name of the author of an astrological almanac first published in 1535, and referred to by Samuel Butler in Hudibras (I.i), and by William Congreve in Love for Love.

Notes

Year of death unknown
English astrological writers
Narrative poems
English poems
Restoration comedy
Year of birth unknown